Olav Marås (born 11 April 1931 in Sæbø) is a Norwegian politician for the Labour Party.

He was elected to the Norwegian Parliament from Hordaland in 1969, but was not re-elected in 1973. He served as a deputy representative during the terms 1965–1969 and 1973–1977. From 1973 to 1974, during the second cabinet Bratteli, Marås was appointed State Secretary in the Ministry of Transport.

On the local level he was a member of Sæbø municipality council from 1955 to 1963, serving the last four years as deputy mayor. He then became a member of the executive committee of its successor municipality Radøy from 1963 to 1972, and mayor from 1983 to 1990. From 1969 to 1971 he was also a member of Hordaland county council.

References

1931 births
Living people
Members of the Storting
Labour Party (Norway) politicians
Mayors of places in Hordaland
Norwegian state secretaries
20th-century Norwegian politicians